The Eastin–Knill theorem is a no-go theorem that states: "No quantum error correcting code can have a continuous symmetry which acts transversely on physical qubits". In other words, no quantum error correcting code can transversely implement a universal gate set. Since quantum computers are inherently noisy, quantum error correcting codes are used to correct errors that affect information due to decoherence.  Decoding error corrected data in order to perform gates on the qubits makes it prone to errors.  Fault tolerant quantum computation avoids this by performing gates on encoded data. Transversal gates, which perform a gate between two "logical" qubits each of which is encoded in N "physical qubits" by pairing up the physical qubits of each encoded qubit ("code block"), and performing independent gates on each pair, can be used to perform fault tolerant but not universal quantum computation because they guarantee that errors don't spread uncontrollably through the computation.  This is because transversal gates ensure that each qubit in a code block is acted on by at most a single physical gate and each code block is corrected independently when an error occurs. Due to the Eastin–Knill theorem, a universal set like } gates can't be implemented transversally. For example, the T gate can't be implemented transversely in the Steane code. This calls for ways of circumventing Eastin–Knill in order to perform fault tolerant quantum computation. In addition to investigating fault tolerant quantum computation, the Eastin–Knill theorem is also useful for studying quantum gravity via the AdS/CFT correspondence and in condensed matter physics via quantum reference frame or many-body theory.

The theorem is named after Bryan Eastin and Emanuel Knill, who published it in 2009.

Approximate Eastin–Knill theorem
The approximate version of the Eastin–Knill theorem states: "If a code admits a continuous symmetry pertaining to a Lie group and corrects erasure with fixed accuracy, then for each logical qubit, a number of physical qubits per subsystem that is inversely proportional to the error parameter is needed". The approximate version of the Eastin–Knill theorem is more robust than the original because it explains why it's impossible to have continuous symmetries for transversal gates on the microscopic scale while also explaining how it's possible to have continuous symmetries for transversal gates on the macroscopic scale.

Circumventing the theorem
The Eastin–Knill theorem does not prohibit protocols that provide fault tolerant quantum computation. Some methods of getting around Eastin–Knill are:
 Code switching
 Code drift
 Using continuous variables
 Shor's fault tolerant toffoli gate
 Teleportation of gates
 Magic state distillation
 Multiple partitions 
 Pieceable fault tolerance 
 Universal braiding

References

Quantum computing